Akbaş (literally "white head") is a Turkish name that may refer to:

People
 Ferhat Akbaş (born 1986), Turkish volleyball coach and former volleyball player
 Fuat Akbaş (1900–?), Turkish wrestler
 Hüseyin Akbaş (1933–1989), Turkish wrestler
 Semanur Akbaş (born 1996), Turkish women's footballer

Places
 Akbaş, Balya, a village
 Akbaş, Bartın, a village in the district of Bartın, Bartın Province
 Akbaş, Bismil
 Akbaş, Çerkeş
 Akbaş, Gerede, a village in the district of Gerede, Bolu Province
 Akbaş, Güdül, a village in the district of Güdül, Ankara Province
 Akbaş, Honaz
 Akbaş, Serik, a village in the district of Serik, Antalya Province

Other
 Akbaş arms depot raid, during the Turkish War of Independence

Turkish-language surnames